A Monument Class Description provides a synthesis and summary of the archaeological evidence for a particular type of British ancient monument. The Monument Class Descriptions were created by English Heritage as part of the Monuments Protection Programme.

Because archaeological remains are seldom good subjects for rigorous classification, these monument classes are regarded as provisional. However, they provide a good basis for beginning to understand the variability of the archaeological record in England.

Prehistoric Monuments

Early Prehistoric Monuments 

 Avenues (multi-period)
 Bank Barrows (multi-period)
 Bowl Barrows (multi-period)
 Causewayed Enclosures
 Concentric Stone Circles
 Cup and Ring Marked Stones (multi-period)
 Cursus
 D-Shaped Barrows
 Enclosed Cremation Cemeteries (multi-period)
 Entrance Graves (multi-period)
 Flint Mines
 Four Poster Stone Circles (multi-period)
 Henge Enclosures
 Henges
 Hengiform Monuments
 Inhumation Cemeteries (Prehistoric) (multi-period)
 Large Irregular Stone Circles (multi-period)
 Large Regular Stone Circles (multi-period)
 Long Barrows
 Long Mortuary Enclosures
 Long Mounds
 Monumental Mounds
 Oval Barrows
 Pit Circles
 Pond Barrows
 Round Barrow Cemeteries (multi-period)
 Simple Passage Graves
 Standing Stones (multi-period)
 Stone Alignments (multi-period)
 Stone Axe Factories (multi-period)
 Timber Circles
 Tor Cairns

Bronze Age 

 Avenues (multi-period)
 Bank Barrows (multi-period)
 Bell Barrows
 Bowl Barrows (multi-period)
 Burnt Mounds
 Cairnfields
 Clothes Line Enclosures (multi-period)
 Coaxial Field Systems (multi-period) - see field systems
 Cross Dykes (multi-period)
 Cup and Ring Marked Stones (multi-period)
 Enclosed Cremation Cemeteries  (multi-period)
 Entrance Graves (multi-period)
 Fancy Barrows
 Four Poster Stone Circles (multi-period)
 Hill Figures (multi-period)
 Hilltop Enclosures (multi-period)
 Inhumation Cemeteries (multi-period)
 Irregular Aggregate Field Systems (multi-period)
 Itford Hill Style Settlements
 Large Irregular Stone Circles (multi-period)
 Large Regular Stone Circles (multi-period)
 Linear Earthworks (multi-period)
 Martin Down Style Enclosures
 Multiple Enclosure Forts (multi-period)
 Rams Hill Style Enclosures
 Regular Aggregate Field Systems (multi-period)
 Ring Cairns
 Round Barrow Cemeteries (multi-period)
 Springfield Style Enclosures (multi-period)
 Standing Stones (multi-period)
 Stone Alignments (multi-period)
 Stone Circles---Small
 Stone Hut Circles
 Unenclosed Bronze Age Urnfields

Iron Age 

 Banjo Enclosures
 Cliff Castles
 Clothes Line Enclosures (multi-period)
 Coaxial Field Systems (multi-period) - see field systems
 Cross Dykes (multi-period)
 Enclosed Oppida
 Gussage Style Settlements
 Hill Figures (multi-period)
 Hilltop Enclosures (multi-period)
 Inhumation Cemeteries (multi-period)
 Irregular Aggregate Field Systems (multi-period)
 Irregular Open Field Systems (multi-period)
 Large Multivallate Hillforts
 Large Univallate Hillforts
 Later Prehistoric Ports
 Linear Earthworks (multi-period)
 Multiple Ditch Systems
 Multiple Enclosure Forts (multi-period)
 Regular Aggregate Field Systems (multi-period)
 Romano-Celtic Temples (multi-period)
 Rounds (multi-period)
 Springfield Style Enclosures (multi-period)
 Standing Stones (multi-period)
 Slight Univallate Hillforts
 Small Multivallate Hillforts
 Square Barrows
 Unenclosed iron Age Urnfields
 Viereckschanzen (multi-period)
 Wooton Hill Style Enclosures

Roman Monuments 

 Aggregate Villages (Romano-British)
 Amphitheatres (Romano-British)
 Basilican Temples (Romano-British)
 Bridges (Romano-British)
 Canals (Romano-British)
 Cemeteries (Romano-British)
 Classical Temples
 Courtyard Houses
 Cross Dykes (multi-period)
 Curtain Frontier Works (Romano-British)
 Extraction Pits
 Farmsteads (Romano-British)
 Fort-Vici (Romano-British)
 Harbours (Romano-British)
 Ironworks
 Irregular Aggregate Field Systems (multi-period)
 Irregular Enclosed Field Systems (multi-period)
 Irregular Open Field Systems (multi-period)
 Major Villas
 Mausolea (Romano-British)
 Mines
 Pharoi
 Potteries
 Quarries (Romano-British)
 Regular Aggregate Field Systems
 Roads (Romano-British)
 Romano-Celtic Temples (multi-period)
 Roman Fishponds
 Roman Fortlets
 Roman Fortresses
 Roman Forts
 Rounds (multi-period)
 Romano-British Lime Kilns
 Romano-British Mansiones
 Romano-British Salterns
 Saxon Shore forts
 Signal Stations
 Vineyards (multi-period)
 Viereckschanzen (multi-period)
 Watermills (Romano-British)

Early Medieval Monuments 

 Animal Pounds
 Aristocratic Residences (Saxon)
 Barrow Fields
 Coaxial Field Systems (multi-period) - see field systems
 Colleges (multi-period)
 Cremation Cemeteries (Anglo-Saxon)
 Cross Dykes (multi-period)
 Double Houses (Pre-Conquest)
 Gate Bridge and Causeway Chapels (multi-period)
 Hermitages (multi-period)
 High Crosses
 Hlaews
 Inhumation Cemeteries (Anglo-Saxon)
 Irregular Enclosed Field Systems (multi-period)
 Irregular Open Field Systems (multi-period)
 Monastic Granges (multi-period)
 Moots (multi-period)
 Nuneries (multi-period)
 Palaces (Anglo-Saxon)
 Parish Churches (multi-period)
 Shrines (Post-Roman) (multi-period)
 Vineyards (multi-period)

Medieval Monuments 

 Almshouses (multi-period)
 Aqueducts (Medieval)
 Archery Butts  (multi-period)
 Artillery Castles (multi-period)
 Bastles (multi-period)
 Beacons (multi-period)
 Blockhouses (multi-period)
 Brickworks (Medieval)
 Camerae
 Chain Towers (multi-period)
 Charterhouses
 Clapper Bridges (multi-period)
 Cockpits (multi-period)
 Coastal Fish Weirs (multi-period)
 Colleges (multi-period)
 Cottages (multi-period)
 Coureries
 Cross Dykes (multi-period)
 Decoy Ponds (multi-period)
 Deerparks (multi-period)
 Double Houses (Post-Conquest)
 Dovecotes (multi-period)
 Earthen Artillery Defences (multi-period)
 Enclosure Castles
 Field Barns (multi-period)
 Field Works (multi-period)
 Fishponds (multi-period)
 Friaries
 Frontier Works
 Glassworks
 Hermitages (multi-period)
 Hospitals (multi-period)
 Ironworks
 Irregular Enclosed Field Systems (multi-period)
 Limekilns
 Magnates Residences
 Moats
 Motte and Bailey Castles
 Motte Castles
 Monasteries- male (Post-Conquest)
 Monastic Granges (multi-period)
 Moots (multi-period)
 Multi-Span Bridges
 Nuneries (multi-period)
 Potteries (Medieval)
 Parish Churches (multi-period)
 Quadrangular Castles
 Regular Enclosed Field Systems (multi-period)
 Regular Open Field Systems
 Ringworks
 River Fisheries (multi-period)
 Roads
 Secular Cathedrals
 Shell Keeps
 Shielings
 Single Span Bridges
 Stockaded Enclosures
 Shrines (Post-Roman) (multi-period)
 Tower Keep Castles (multi-period)
 Trackways
 Vills
 Vineyards (multi-period)
 Warrens
 Water Meadows
 Watermills
 Woods (multi-period)

Post Medieval Monuments 

 Almshouses (multi-period)
 Animal Pounds
 Archery Butts  (multi-period)
 Artillery Castles (multi-period)
 Bastles (multi-period)
 Beacons (multi-period)
 Blockhouses (multi-period)
 Cathedrals (Post-Reformation)
 Chain Towers (multi-period)
 Clapper Bridges (multi-period)
 Cockpits (multi-period)
 Coastal Fish Weirs (multi-period)
 Cottages (multi-period)
 Decoy Ponds (multi-period)
 Deerparks (multi-period)
 Dovecotes (multi-period)
 Earthen Artillery Defences (multi-period)
 Field Barns (multi-period)
 Field Works (multi-period)
 Fishponds (multi-period)
 Hospitals (multi-period)
 Ice Houses
 Irregular Enclosed Field Systems (multi-period)
 Martello Towers
 Mausolea
 Monastic Granges (multi-period)
 Non-Conformist Chapels
 Parish Churches (multi-period)
 Regular Enclosed Field Systems (multi-period)
 River Fisheries (multi-period)
 Tower Houses (multi-period)
 Tower Keep Castles (multi-period)
 Woods (multi-period)

External links

 English Heritage Monument Class Descriptions

Archaeology of the United Kingdom